is an interchange passenger railway station located in the city of Tama, Tokyo, Japan operated jointly by the private railway companies Keio Corporation and Odakyū Electric Railway. The stations are formally known as Keiō-Nagayama (Keiō) and Odakyū-Nagayama.

Lines 
On the Odakyū Tama Line, it is 6.8 kilometers from the terminus of the line at Shin-Yurigaoka Station and 28.3 kilometers from Shinjuku Station.

Station layout 
This station consists of two sets of elevated opposed side platforms serving a total of four tracks. All trains stop at this station.

Keiō Corporation (Keiō-Nagayama Station) platforms

Odakyū Electric Railway (Odakyū-Nagayama Station) platforms

History
 June 1, 1974: Odakyū-Nagayama Station opens as a local stop with the extension of the Odakyū Tama Line.
 October 18, 1974: Keiō-Nagayama Station opens as a local and rapid stop with the extension of the Keiō Sagamihara Line.
 December 2, 2000: Special express Homeway and express trains begin service on the Tama Line, stopping at Nagayama.
 March 27, 2001: On the Sagamihara Line, express trains begin service, stopping at Nagayama; special express trains are abolished.
 March 23, 2002: Tama Express trains begin service on the Tama Line, stopping at Nagayama.
 December 11, 2004: Section semi-express trains begin service on the Tama Line, stopping at Nagayama.
 March 2006: Odakyū-Nagayama Station renewal construction completed.
 March 15, 2008: Special express Metro Homeway trains begin service on the Tama Line, stopping at Nagayama.

Passenger statistics
In fiscal 2019, the Keio station was used by an average of 46,013 passengers daily, making it the 20th busiest station in the Keio system During the same period, the Odakyu station was used by an average of 31,056 passengers daily, making it the 37th busiest station in the Odakyu system.

Surrounding area
The station sits at the heart of the planned Tama New Town suburb, complementing the neighboring Tama-Center Station.

See also
 List of railway stations in Japan

References

External links

 Keiō Corporation - Keiō-Nagayama Station 
 Odakyū Electric Railway - Odakyū-Nagayama Station 

Railway stations in Tokyo
Stations of Keio Corporation
Stations of Odakyu Electric Railway
Keio Sagamihara Line
Odakyu Tama Line
Railway stations in Japan opened in 1974
Tama, Tokyo